The Northwest Sound Men's Chorus is a men's a cappella chorus in Bellevue, Washington, as a chapter of the Evergreen District, a part of the Barbershop Harmony Society. The chorus celebrated its 25th anniversary in 2010. Its membership draws from the Greater Puget Sound area. The group does a yearly community outreach, "Sing, Sing, Sing!", that offers free singing lessons for men of all ages.

History
The Northwest Sound Men's Chorus was chartered by Barbershop Harmony Society in 1985. The chorus has won numerous awards since its inception:
Evergreen District Chorus champions
1986
1988
1990
1991
1992
1994
2005
2014 (placed 1st),
Barbershop Harmony Society International Chorus Finals contestant:
1987
1989 (placed 10th)
1991 (placed 12th)
1992 (placed 9th)
1993 (placed 9th)
1995 (placed 16th)
2006 (placed 20th)
2009 (placed 19th),
2011 (placed 21st)

Joining
The Northwest Sound Men's Chorus holds open auditions year round for new members in all vocal parts.  The audition process includes a pre-screening and a demonstration of "tonality, listening and musicality" with one of the chorus's repertoire songs.

See also
Barbershop Harmony Society
Barbershop music
A cappella music

References

External links
Official website
Evergreen District website

Choirs in Washington (state)
Musical groups established in 1985
1985 establishments in Washington (state)
Barbershop Harmony Society choruses